The chief master sergeant of the Space Force (acronym: CMSSF) is the senior enlisted advisor to the chief of space operations and the secretary of the Air Force. The chief master sergeant of the Space Force is the most senior enlisted guardian in the U.S. Space Force, unless an enlisted guardian is serving as the Senior Enlisted Advisor to the Chairman.

The current chief master sergeant of the Space Force is Roger A. Towberman, who assumed the office on 3 April 2020.

Responsibilities
The chief master sergeant of the Space Force serves as the senior enlisted advisor to both the chief of space operations and the secretary of the Air Force on all matters regarding the welfare, readiness, morale, proper utilization, and progress of Space Force enlisted members and their families.

Insignia

The first rank insignia worn by the chief master sergeant of the Space Force, was based upon the rank insignia of the Air Force's chief master sergeant rank insignia, with other components, such as the two stars, designed to be consistent with the senior enlisted advisor rank of the other services. The delta, orbit, and globe elements at the center of the rank were taken from the seal of the United States Space Force. However, unlike the insignia of the Chief Master Sergeant of the Air Force which has a Laurel wreath around the central star within the rockers, the CMSSF insignia does not. On 20 September 2021, new insignia for all enlisted in the Space Force was introduced, including the CMSSF.

History
The inaugural chief master sergeant of the Space Force, Chief Master Sergeant Roger A. Towberman, was sworn in on 3 April 2020, having previously served as the command chief master sergeant of the Air Force Space Command, and co-currently serving as the senior enlisted leader of the United States Space Command. In addition to being the first chief master sergeant of the Space Force, he is also the second member of the Space Force and its first enlisted member.

The position was originally known as the senior enlisted advisor of the Space Force (SEASF) from 3 April 2020 until it was renamed on 1 February 2021.

List of chief master sergeants of the Space Force

Timeline

See also
 Senior Enlisted Advisor to the Chairman of the Joint Chiefs of Staff
 Sergeant Major of the Army
 Sergeant Major of the Marine Corps
 Chief Master Sergeant of the Air Force
 Master Chief Petty Officer of the Navy
 Master Chief Petty Officer of the Coast Guard
 Senior Enlisted Advisor for the National Guard Bureau

References

Enlisted ranks of the United States Space Force
Space Force